Reindhold Scheibler (born on 2 or 22 June 1889, in  Berlin - dead.?) was a teacher, translator and prose writer of German ethnicity in the Kingdom of Romania, author of a German translation of the poem "Luceafărul",  mayor of Chișinău in 1938.

Biography 
Reindhold Scheibler studied at the Faculty of Letters, becoming a German professor at the Commercial High School in Chișinău. He also worked as a teacher at the Military High School Monastery Hill. He was one of the leaders of "The Straits of the Country" (in Romanian, Straja Țării) public movement and commander of the scouting movement. As a translator he manifested himself by translating the writings of Mihai Eminescu, Octavian Goga, Dimitrie Bolintineanu and others into German. In addition to the translatation work, in the encyclopaedia "Contemporary Figures from Bessarabia" Chișinău (1939), also appears his original work: "Pharaoh's Hand", "The Dream of the Watchman", "On the Other Way" and "A Night in the Camp".

References 

1889 births
Romanian nationalists
Mayors of Chișinău
20th-century Romanian people
Romanian translators
Year of death missing